Illinois station or Illinois Avenue station is a DART Light Rail station in Dallas, Texas. It is located in the Oak Cliff neighborhood on Denley Drive, north of Illinois Avenue. It opened on June 14, 1996, and is a station on the DART , serving nearby residences and businesses, featuring bus service to Mountain View College, Fair Park, the Dallas VA Medical Center, and Paul Quinn College.  This was the initial southern terminus for the Blue Line until it was extended to Ledbetter in May 1997.

Outbound, this is the last stop for Blue Line trains on grade-separated tracks. South of this station, the tracks swing onto a viaduct and the line then runs in the middle of Lancaster Road for the journey to Ledbetter after Ledbetter trains run grade separated again to UNT Dallas

References

External links 
 DART - Illinois Station

Dallas Area Rapid Transit light rail stations in Dallas
Railway stations in the United States opened in 1996
1996 establishments in Texas
Railway stations in Dallas County, Texas